Five Star Prison Cell was an Australian four-piece band from Melbourne, Australia, whose music was generally labelled as tech metal or math rock. They were known for their use of unusual time signatures, dissonant guitar riffs, and a vocal approach that explored many different avenues and styles.

History
Five Star Prison Cell was formed in 2004 from members of various other bands. Vocalist Adam Glynn came from Melbourne band Frankenbok, Marc Whitworth had played drums for Gold Coast band Tension and Cameron Macdonald and Mark Holain played bass and guitar in Extra Virgin. The group was initially conceived as a one-off studio project but after Extra Virgin disbanded it was decided to continue with Five Star Prison Cell.

In 2005, the band released its debut album The Complete First Season through Faultline Records. During the year the band toured throughout Australia and supported Arch Enemy and Spiderbait. Much of the following year was spent writing and recording another album.

On 14 November 2006, Five Star Prison Cell won the annual Musicoz award for best metal/hardcore act of 2006. A new album, Slaves of Virgo, was issued in March 2007.

Five Star Prison Cell have rigorously toured Australia and New Zealand throughout their career, and have shared the stage with many international acts including: The Dillinger Escape Plan, Danzig, Cephalic Carnage, The Black Dahlia Murder, Arch Enemy and Clutch.

In early 2010, Five Star Prison Cell completed recording their third album, titled Matriarch with Australian producer Forrester Savell (Karnivool, The Butterfly Effect, Helmet). The album was released in May and supported by a nationwide tour.

April 2011 Five Star Prison Cell decided to disband and go their separate ways.  No particular reason was provided other than wanting to focus on other areas in their lives.  They remain best of friends and have left the door open to the possibility of doing another album in the future.

In October 2013, Five Star Prison Cell announced their re-activation.

Band members
 Adam Glynn - vocals
 Mark Holain - guitar
 Cameron Macdonald – bass
 Marc Whitworth - drums

Discography
The Complete First Season - 2005
Slaves of Virgo - 2007
Matriarch - 2010

Notes and references

LOUD! Magazine, issue 38, May/June 2005

External links 
 
 Five Star on MySpace
 Interview from Australian Music Online, 2/21/2005
 Five Star Prison Cell Feature Interview at Blistering magazine
 Metalforge interview (and take on math metal)

Experimental musical groups
Math rock groups
Victoria (Australia) musical groups
Australian heavy metal musical groups
Musical groups established in 2004
Musical groups disestablished in 2011